Sidney James (born Solomon Joel Cohen; 8 May 1913 – 26 April 1976) was a South African actor and comedian whose career encompassed radio, television, stage and screen. He was best known for numerous roles in the Carry On film series.

Born to a middle-class Jewish family in South Africa, James started his career in his native country before finding his greatest success in the UK. Beginning his screen career playing bit parts in films from 1947, he was cast in numerous small and supporting roles into the 1950s. He appeared in the film The Lavender Hill Mob in 1951, starring Alec Guinness. 

His profile was raised as Tony Hancock's co-star in Hancock's Half Hour, first in the radio series and later when it was adapted for television and ran from 1954 to 1960. Afterwards, he became known as a regular performer in the Carry On films, appearing in 19 films of the series, with the top billing roles in 17 (in the other two he was cast below Frankie Howerd). 

His starring roles in television sitcoms continued. He starred in the 1970s sitcom Bless This House until his death in 1976.

Early life

James was born Solomon Joel Cohen on 8 May 1913, to Jewish parents in South Africa, then a British dominion, later changing his name to Sidney Joel Cohen, and then Sidney James. His family lived on Hancock Street in Hillbrow, Johannesburg. He claimed various previous occupations, including diamond cutter, dance tutor and boxer, but in reality had trained and worked as a hairdresser.

It was at a hairdressing salon in Kroonstad, Orange Free State, that he met his first wife. He married Berthe Sadie Delmont, known as Toots, on 12 August 1936 and they had a daughter, Elizabeth, born in 1937. His father-in-law, Joseph Delmont, a Johannesburg businessman, bought a hairdressing salon for James, but within a year he announced that he wanted to become an actor and joined the Johannesburg Repertory Players. Through this group, he gained work with the South African Broadcasting Corporation. Toots divorced him in 1940.

During the Second World War, he served as a lieutenant in an entertainment unit of the South African Army, and subsequently took up acting as a career. He moved to the United Kingdom in December 1946, financed by his service gratuity. Initially, he worked in repertory before being spotted for the nascent British post-war film industry.

Career

From 1947 to 1968
James made his first credited film appearances in Night Beat and Black Memory in 1947, both crime dramas. He played the alcoholic hero's barman in Powell and Pressburger's The Small Back Room in 1949.

The Lavender Hill Mob in 1951 was his first comedy film, ranked 17th out of the 100 best British films by the British Film Institute: with Alfie Bass, he made up the bullion robbery gang headed by Alec Guinness and Stanley Holloway.

He also appeared in Lady Godiva Rides Again and The Galloping Major, both films were released in 1951, and as Harry Hawkins in The Titfield Thunderbolt (1953), and also had a lead role in The Wedding of Lilli Marlene. He featured in another Alec Guinness film, Father Brown (US: The Detective, 1954) and in Trapeze (1956) as Harry the snake charmer, a circus film which was one of the most successful films of its year, and he played Master Henry in "Outlaw Money" (also 1956), an episode of The Adventures of Robin Hood. 

James had a supporting part as a TV advertisement producer in Charlie Chaplin's A King in New York, a non-comic supporting role as a journalist in the science-fiction film Quatermass 2, and he performed in Hell Drivers (all 1957), a film with Stanley Baker. The next year, James starred with Miriam Karlin in East End, West End by Wolf Mankowitz, a half-hour comedy series for the ITV company Associated Rediffusion. Set within the Jewish community of London's East End, the series of six episodes was transmitted in February and March 1958, but plans for further episodes were abandoned after a disappointing response. For a while though, it had looked as if his commitment elsewhere might end his work with Tony Hancock, one of the most popular television comedians of the time.

He had begun working with Tony Hancock in 1954, in his BBC Radio series Hancock's Half Hour. Having seen him in The Lavender Hill Mob, it was the idea of Hancock's writers, Galton and Simpson, to cast James. He played a character with his own name (but having the invented middle name Balmoral) who was a petty criminal and would usually manage to con Hancock in some way, although the character eventually ceased to be Hancock's adversary. With the exception of James, the other regular cast members of the radio series were dropped when the series made the transition to television. His part in the show now greatly increased and many viewers came to think of Hancock and James as a double act.

Feeling the format had become exhausted, Hancock decided to end his professional relationship with James at the end of the sixth television series in 1960. Although the two men remained friends, James was upset at his colleague's decision. The experience led to a shift away from the kind of roles for which he had become best known. He remained the lovable rogue but was keen to steer clear of criminal characters - in 1960 he turned down the part of Fagin in the original West End staging of Oliver! for that very reason.  Galton and Simpson continued to write for both James and Hancock for a while, and the Sidney Balmoral James character resurfaced in the Citizen James (1960–1962) series. Sid James was now consistently taking the lead role in his television work. Taxi! (1963–64) was his next series. A comedy-drama rather than a sitcom, it was created by Ted Willis, but although it ran to two series, the programme was not particularly successful.

In 1964, he made his first of two appearances on The Eamonn Andrews Show. The first few moments of the opening credits of one of them can be heard and seen in the television show Undermind, Episode 6, "Intent to Destroy", broadcast on 12 June 1965. His name is heard announced, and the show is seen on a television camera seconds later.

In 1968, James, Val Doonican and Arthur Askey were filmed playing golf in Cockington  (British Pathé archives, film reference 457.1), for their production Viva Torbay: Travelling to the British Seaside.

Carry On films
James became a leading member of the Carry On films team, originally to replace Ted Ray, who had appeared in Carry On Teacher (1959). It had been intended that Ray would become a recurring presence in the Carry On series, but he was dropped after just one film because of contractual problems. James ultimately made 19 Carry On films, receiving top billing in 17, making him one of the most featured performers of the regular cast.

The characters he portrayed in the films were usually very similar to the wise-cracking, sly, lecherous Cockney he was famed for playing on television, and in most cases they bore the name Sid or Sidney, for example, Sir Sidney Ruff-Diamond in Carry On Up the Khyber and Sid Boggle in Carry On Camping. His trademark "dirty laugh" was often used and became, along with a world-weary "Cor, blimey!", his catchphrase. His laugh can be heard here .

There were Carry On films in which James played characters who were not called Sid or Sidney: Carry On Constable (1960), in which he played Sergeant Frank Wilkins; Carry On Henry (1971), a parody of the TV series The Six Wives of Henry VIII; Carry On Abroad (1972), in which James's character was named Vic Flange; and Carry On Dick (1974), a parody version of the legend of the highwayman Dick Turpin. In Henry and Dick, James played the title roles, while in Carry On Cleo he played Mark Antony. In Carry On Cowboy (1965), he adopted an American accent for his part as "The Rumpo Kid". (James had previously played an American (with an American accent) in the films Give Us This Day (1949), Orders Are Orders (1954), A Yank in Ermine (1955), Wicked as They Come (1956), Chaplin's A King in New York (1957) and Another Time, Another Place (1958).)

Later career
In 1967, James was intending to play Sergeant Nocker in Follow That Camel, but was already committed to recording the TV series George and the Dragon (1966–1968) for ATV, then one of the ITV contractors. James was replaced in Follow That Camel by the American comic actor Phil Silvers. On 13 May 1967, two weeks after the filming began of what eventually became an entry in the Carry On series, James suffered a severe heart attack. In the same year in Carry On Doctor, James was shown mainly lying in a hospital bed, owing to his real-life health problems. After his heart attack, James gave up his heavy cigarette habit and instead smoked a pipe or an occasional cigar; he lost weight, ate only one main meal a day, and limited himself to two or three alcoholic drinks per evening.

His success in TV situation comedy continued with the programmes Two in Clover (1969–70) and Bless This House (1971–1976); the latter led to a film version in 1972.

Personal life
James married three times. He and his first wife, Berthe Sadie Delmont, were married in 1936 and a daughter, Elizabeth, was born in 1937; they were divorced in 1940, mainly as a result of his many relationships with other women.

In 1943, he married a dancer, Meg Sergei (née Williams; 28 August 1913 – 10 April 1977; aged 63); in 1947, they had a daughter Reina. They were divorced on 17 August 1952.

On 21 August 1952, James married Valerie Elizabeth Patsy Assan (1928 – 8 May 2022; aged 93), an actress who used Ashton as her stage name. They had a son, Steve James, born in 1954, who became a music producer, and a daughter, Sue, who became a television producer. During the latter part of their marriage, they lived in a house partly designed by James himself, Delaford Park, in Iver, Buckinghamshire, a location close enough to Pinewood Studios to allow him to return home for lunch while filming. During his marriage to Valerie, he had a well-publicised affair with Carry On co-star Barbara Windsor lasting three years. The affair was dramatised in the 1998 stage-play Cleo, Camping, Emmanuelle and Dick and its 2000 television adaptation Cor, Blimey!. James's obsession with Windsor was such that it was rumoured that her then husband Ronnie Knight had all of James's furniture rearranged at home as a subtle threat and, on another occasion, put an axe in James's floor, but close friends of the time, including Vince Powell and William G. Stewart, dismissed the suggestions. According to his biographer Cliff Goodwin, James struck his pregnant girlfriend, and he also struck his first wife when she was pregnant.

James was an inveterate and largely unsuccessful gambler, losing tens of thousands of pounds over his lifetime. His gambling addiction was such that he had an agreement with his agent, Michael Sullivan, under which his wife was not told how much he was being paid, so that a portion could be set aside for gambling.

Death
James was on tour on a revival of production The Mating Season, on 26 April, 1976 when he suffered a heart attack on stage at the Sunderland Empire Theatre. Actresses Olga Lowe and Audrey Jeans thought that he was playing a practical joke at first when he failed to reply to their dialogue.  When he failed to reply to their ad libs, they moved towards the wings to seek help. The technical manager, Melvyn James (no relation), called for the curtain to close and requested a doctor, while the audience – who were unaware of what was happening – laughed, believing the events to be part of the show. An ambulance was called and he was pronounced dead on arrival at Sunderland Royal Hospital. He was 62.

James was cremated and his ashes were scattered at Golders Green Crematorium.

Legacy

James has been the subject of at least five tribute shows: a 1996 one-off tribute, The Very Best of Sid James; as the focus of a 2000 episode of the series The Unforgettable; a 2002 episode of Heroes of Comedy; Channel Four's With Out Walls, Seriously Seeking Sid in the late 1980s; and in 2013, the BBC's The Many Faces Of Sid James.

James was played by Geoffrey Hutchings in Terry Johnson's play Cleo, Camping, Emmanuelle and Dick, which premiered at the National Theatre in 1998. Hutchings reprised the role in the subsequent film adaptation, Cor, Blimey!.

In the 2006 BBC television film Kenneth Williams: Fantabulosa!, James was played by Ged McKenna.

In August 2018 it was announced that a radio interview which James had recorded for BBC Radio Solent on 22 March 1976 had been re-discovered during research for a forthcoming BBC radio documentary celebrating the Carry On film series. The recording had been kept by BBC presenter Jeff Link, who had carried out the original interview. In the interview, James discusses his attempts to keep fit by skipping, his preference for working in films, his genuine affection for the Carry On films, and other topics. The interview is notable for its relaxed, humorous style. The producer of the forthcoming BBC Carry On documentary, Richard Latto, contacted James's surviving daughters after confirming the recording's authenticity. Reina James commented: "To hear him talking just before he's about to die.. there's something hugely moving about that". Sue James called the interview "lovely and sympathetic".

A  Heritage Foundation commemorative blue plaque to James, was installed at the former Teddington Studios on Broom Road Teddington, Greater London, until 30 June 2015 when it was stolen, just before the building was demolished to make way for housing.

Filmography

References

Further reading
 Sidney James at Oxford Dictionary of National Biography

External links
 
 
  at Aveleyman

1913 births
1976 deaths
People from Johannesburg
20th-century South African male actors
20th-century English male actors
British male comedy actors
Deaths onstage
English male film actors
English male radio actors
English male stage actors
English male television actors
English Jews
English gamblers
Jewish English comedians
Jewish English male actors
People from Buckinghamshire 
People from Hillbrow
Golders Green Crematorium
South African emigrants to the United Kingdom
South African Jews
White South African people
South African military personnel of World War II
South African Army officers
Military personnel from Johannesburg